La perla may refer to:

 La Perla District, Peru
 La Perla, Veracruz, Mexico
 La Perla, San Juan, Puerto Rico, area of Old San Juan in Puerto Rico
 Teatro La Perla, Ponce, Puerto Rico
 La Perla Spa, a building in Mar del Plata, Argentina
La Perla, a former detention center in Córdoba, Argentina
 La perla (film),  a Mexican film of Steinbeck's novel The Pearl
 Hotel La Perla, a hotel in Pamplona, Spain
 La Perla (clothing), an Italian luxury lifestyle company established in 1954
 La Perla (painting), 1518-1520 painting by Giulio Romano
Music
 "La Perla", an Italian song by Franz Liszt
 "La Perla" (Calle 13 song), a Spanish song by alternative-reggaeton duo Calle 13
 "La Perla", a single by Kobojsarna, 2010
La Perla, the nickname of ranchero singer, Malena Cano

See also
 Perla (disambiguation)
 
 
 The Pearl (novel), by John Steinbeck